Hopea acuminata is a species of plant in the family Dipterocarpaceae. It is endemic to the Philippines. Locally called manggachapui and also dalingdingan, it is a hard straight grained wood that was used to build the early Manila galleons; it having qualities of being so dense as to not be affected by wood boring insects and one supposes marine worms.

References

acuminata
Endemic flora of the Philippines
Trees of the Philippines
Taxonomy articles created by Polbot
Taxa named by Elmer Drew Merrill

Vulnerable flora of Asia